Deinandra halliana, or Hall's tarplant, is a California species of plants in the tribe Madieae within the family Asteraceae. It has been found in the Coast Ranges of Central California, in Monterey, Fresno, San Benito, and San Luis Obispo Counties.

Deinandra halliana is an annual herb up to 120 cm (4 feet) tall. It produces numerous flower heads in an open array, each head containing 8-14 yellow ray florets and as many as 60 disc florets with yellow corollas but yellow or brown anthers.

References

External links
photo of herbarium specimen at Missouri Botanical Garden, collected in San Luis Obispo County, isotype of ''Deinandra halliana'

halliana
Flora of California
Plants described in 1935
Flora without expected TNC conservation status